An inoculation loop (also called a smear loop, inoculation wand or microstreaker) is a simple tool used mainly by microbiologists to pick up and transfer a small sample of microorganisms called inoculum from a microbial culture, e.g. for streaking on a culture plate. This process is called inoculation.

The tool consists of a thin handle with a loop about 5 mm wide or smaller at the end.  It was originally made of twisted metal wire (such as platinum, tungsten or nichrome), but disposable molded plastic versions are now common.

See also

 Cell spreader
 Micropipette

References

Laboratory equipment
Microbiology equipment